Haedropleura flexicosta is a species of sea snail, a marine gastropod mollusk in the family Horaiclavidae.

It was previously included within the family Turridae.

Description

Distribution
This species occurs in the Mediterranean Sea.

References

  Monterosato T. A. (di) (1884). Nomenclatura generica e specifica di alcune conchiglie mediterranee. Palermo, Virzi, 152 pp
 Micali P., 2010: Nota sul genere Haedropleura B.D.D., 1883 nel Mediterraneo; Malacologia Mostra Mondiale 67: 3–5

External links
  Tucker, J.K. 2004 Catalog of recent and fossil turrids (Mollusca: Gastropoda). Zootaxa 682:1–1295.
 

flexicosta